Magomed Omarov may refer to:

 Magomed Omarov (politician) (died 2005), deputy Interior Minister for the Russian republic of Dagestan
 Magomed Omarov (boxer) (born 1989), Russian amateur boxer